Carlos Airala (born 25 August 2002) is an Argentine footballer currently playing as a midfielder for Ferro Carril Oeste of the Primera B Nacional.

Career statistics

Club

Notes

References

2002 births
Living people
Argentine footballers
Association football midfielders
Primera Nacional players
Ferro Carril Oeste footballers